Wrexham County Borough Council is the governing body for Wrexham County Borough, a principal area in north Wales, covering Wrexham and the surrounding area.

History 
Elections take place every five years. The Labour Party held power on the council after the 2012 election, but lost it after splitting because of an internal row. Several Labour councillors became independent, allowing the Independent group to take control in alliance with the Conservatives.

At the 2017 election, the independents retained their dominance. A coalition of the Independent group, the Wrexham Independents group and the Conservatives agreed to run the council for the next 5 years to 2022. On 28 November 2018 Councillor Paul Rogers left the Conservative Group to become non-aligned. He then went on to join the Independent group on 15 May 2019. On 7 November 2019, Councillor Ronnie Prince also joined the main Independent group having been non-aligned since the last election. Independent councillor for Gwersyllt North, Barrie Warburton, resigned his seat on 16 January 2020, and was subsequently replaced by Plaid Cymru's Phil Rees who won the by-election on Thursday 27 February. On 29 September 2020 Paul Jones, Labour Councillor for Maesydre, resigned his seat for personal reasons, he was replaced by Plaid Cymru's Becca Martin in a by-election on 18 March 2021.

Following the 2022 election on 5 May 2022, the council was under no overall control with no single party holding a majority of the now fifty-six councillors following a local boundary review. The independents (composed of two managed groups) maintained their position as the largest affiliation with twenty-three seats, down two from 2017 but fell short of the minimum twenty-nine councillors needed for a majority. Labour gained two seats, Plaid Cymru six, Conservatives remained the same and the Liberal Democrats lost a seat. Independents were initially in talks with Welsh Labour councillors over the 7-8 May weekend.

On 10 May 2022, the two formerly separately organised groups of independents in the council (the Independents, led by Mark Pritchard, and the "Wrexham Independents" group, led by David A Bithell) merged into one combined group: "the Independent Group". The group contains twenty-one of the twenty-three independent politicians elected, with Mike Davies and Ronnie Prince being the only two independents not to join the group. It is led by incumbent council leader and deputy leader, Mark Pritchard and David A Bithell respectively. On the start of more talks between Labour and the Independent Group, Labour Cllr Davies questioned whether the merger was an attempt to stay in power, and questioned the relationship between Cllr Pritchard and Cllr Bithell over a rumoured falling out prior to the election. However, Cllr Davies added if they are "able to reconcile their differences" and have a "new and ambitious agenda", then Welsh Labour would welcome the merger.

On 11 May 2022, the Independent Group formed another coalition with the Welsh Conservatives for the next five-year term following an agreement between the two. The coalition would have thirty members, a four-seat majority on the 56 seat council. Labour Cllr Davies said that the IndependentConservatives deal was based on "pure self-interest" "to protect their own positions". The leader of Plaid Cymru in the council, Marc Jones, also claimed the deal was more focused in retaining power than on representation. Welsh Labour leader on the council, Dana Davies claimed talks between the independents and Labour, failed due to Labour's requirement that any deal involves all councillors undertaking training on addressing anti-Semitism, homophobia, racism and sexism. Cllr Davies described the deal involving anti-discrimination training to be a "UK-first" and "ground-breaking" if it had been agreed. Talks with Plaid Cymru were ruled out from the beginning by the independents due to Plaid Cymru's disagreement with Mark Pritchard's leadership.

Following the announcement, the Independent Group and the Welsh Conservatives described it as "an exciting time for Wrexham", and Cllr Pritchard and Conservative group leader Hugh Jones said that they are "pleased to have reached a workable agreement [...] we will continue to build on our success". Opposition in the council would be Welsh Labour, Plaid Cymru, the two non-aligned independents, and the Liberal Democrat councillor.

On 24 May 2022, Councillor Brian Cameron was appointed as mayor of Wrexham, after previously serving as deputy mayor.

Political control
The first election to the new council was held in 1995, initially operating as a shadow authority before coming into its powers on 1 April 1996. Political control of the council since 1996 has been held by the following parties:

Leadership
The role of Mayor of Wrexham is largely ceremonial. Political leadership is instead provided by the leader of the council. The leaders since 1996 have been:

Current composition 
As at 5 May 2022:

Elections
Since 2012, elections have taken place every five years. The last election was 5 May 2022.

Party with the most elected councillors in bold. Coalition agreements in notes column.

Premises
The council is based at the Guildhall off Rhosddu Road in the centre of Wrexham, overlooking the open space of Llwyn Isaf. The Guildhall was built between 1959 and 1961 for the original Wrexham Borough Council. It subsequently served as the headquarters of Wrexham Maelor Borough Council between 1974 and 1996, when the current Wrexham County Borough Council was created.

Electoral divisions

The county borough is divided into forty-nine electoral wards returning fifty-six councillors. There are 35 communities in the county borough, some of which have their own elected council.

See also 
 Mayor of Wrexham
 List of places in Wrexham County Borough
 Wrexham Maelor Council (pre-1996)

Notes

References

 County Borough of Wrexham (Electoral Arrangements) Order 1998
 The County Borough of Wrexham (Electoral Arrangements) Order 2021

External links
Official website
Wrexham.com's coverage of local elections including candidate Q&As

Politics of Wrexham
Wrexham